Daniel Nestor and Nenad Zimonjić defeated Mahesh Bhupathi and Max Mirnyi in the final, 7–6(8–6), 6–4 to win the doubles tennis title at the 2010 ATP World Tour Finals.

Bob Bryan and Mike Bryan were the defending champions, but were defeated by Nestor and Zimonjić in the semifinals.

Seeds

Draw

Finals

Group A
Standings are determined by: 1. number of wins; 2. number of matches; 3. in two-players-ties, head-to-head records; 4. in three-players-ties, percentage of sets won, or of games won; 5. steering-committee decision.

Group B
Standings are determined by: 1. number of wins; 2. number of matches; 3. in two-players-ties, head-to-head records; 4. in three-players-ties, percentage of sets won, or of games won; 5. steering-committee decision.

External links
Main Draw

Doubles